Lucian Cristian Marinescu (born 24 June 1972 in Bucharest) is a Romanian former football player and current Spanish teacher. He played for a few clubs, including Rapid Bucharest, UD Salamanca and SC Farense. He played for the Romania national football team and was a participant at the 1998 FIFA World Cup. Since retirement he has become a transfer agent linked with his former club Rapid Bucharest.
As of 2023 he has been teaching at a high school in Chico California called Chico Senior High School as a Spanish teacher.

References

External links
 
 
 
 

1972 births
Living people
Romanian footballers
Romania international footballers
Romanian expatriate footballers
1998 FIFA World Cup players
CSM Reșița players
FC Rapid București players
La Liga players
Primeira Liga players
UD Salamanca players
S.C. Farense players
Associação Académica de Coimbra – O.A.F. players
G.D. Chaves players
Expatriate footballers in Spain
Expatriate footballers in Portugal
Romanian expatriate sportspeople in Portugal
A.P.O. Akratitos Ano Liosia players
Association football midfielders